Riccardo Burchielli (born 27 February 1975) is an Italian artist known for his work on the DC/Vertigo comic book series DMZ, his first work in the United States.

Early life
Burchielli was born in Peccioli, near Pisa, Tuscany.

Career
Burchielli began his career in 1997, with a story of Desdy Metus and later he worked for Ediperiodici. From 2003, he illustrated three stories for John Doe.  In 2005 he co-created DMZ with writer Brian Wood: the series, published under DC Comics; Vertigo label, was a huge success in both the United States and the rest of the world. It is thanks to his extraordinary work on DMZ that in 2007 he received the prestigious Gran Guinigi Award for Best Artist at Lucca Comics & Games.

After DMZ, he continued to lend his art to the major publishers and characters of the American comic book industry, drawing Batman, Conan and Avengers. In 2010, he was among the founding members of Italian Job Studio, a creative collective active in the television and cross-media production field. In the same year his works were exhibited at the Cité dell'Architecture in Paris as part of the Exhibition Archi & BD, alongside those of masters such as Moebius, Bilal, Lorenzo Mattotti, Winsor McCay and Frank Miller. In 2014 he worked on Highway To Hell, a horror miniseries winner of two Ghastly Awards and nominated for the prestigious Bram Stoker Awards, written by Victor Gischler and Boosta. While collaborating with Sergio Bonelli Editore on Dylan Dog, in recent years he put his skills as a storyteller at the service of brands such as Ferrari and BMW Motorrad and as a character designer for cinema and video games. In 2021 DMZ became a TV series directed by Golden Globe winner Ava DuVernay for the American platform HBO Max. 

His works are characterized by an intense representation of the conflict between body and space, in which his skillful use of light and shadow enhances physical and conceptual contrasts.

References

External links

1975 births
Living people
People from the Province of Pisa
Italian comics artists